The Tomb, also known as Edgar Allan Poe's Ligeia, is a 2009 horror film directed by Michael Staininger and starring Wes Bentley, Sofya Skya, Kaitlin Doubleday, Michael Madsen, and Eric Roberts. It is based on the short story "Ligeia" by Edgar Allan Poe.

Plot 
Jonathan Merrick, a best-seller author, falls in love with a fascinating girl named Ligeia. But she keeps a deadly secret, she is ill and she needs to steal souls to survive. In her quest for immortality she will do anything to keep death away. Jonathan, haunted by her beauty, breaks up with his girlfriend Rowena. Ligeia and Merrick take a house on the shores of Black Sea and he enters into a dark and hopeless world.

Cast
 Wes Bentley as Jonathan Merrick
 Sofya Skya as Ligeia
 Kaitlin Doubleday as Rowena
 Mackenzie Rosman as Lorelei
 Christa Campbell as Mrs. Burris
 Cary-Hiroyuki Tagawa as Mr. Burris 
 Eric Roberts as Vaslov  
 Michael Madsen

Release 
The film premiered at the 2009 St. Louis International Film Festival.

See also 
Roger Corman
Edgar Allan Poe in television and film

References

External links 
 

2009 films
2009 horror films
Remakes of American films
American supernatural horror films
Films based on short fiction
Films based on works by Edgar Allan Poe
Horror film remakes
2000s English-language films
2000s American films